Gangubai Hangal (5 March 1913 – 21 July 2009) was an Indian singer of the khayal genre of Hindustani classical music from Karnataka, who was known for her deep and powerful voice. Hangal belonged to the Kirana gharana.

Early life
Gangubai Hangal was born in Dharwad to Chikkurao Nadiger, an agriculturist and Ambabai, a vocalist of Carnatic music. Hangal received only elementary education and her family shifted to Hubli in 1928 so that Gangubai could study Hindustani music. She began to train formally aged 13 with Krishnacharya Hulgur, a kinnari (stringed instrument like a veena)player, studying Hindustani classical music. From Hulgur, Gangubai learned sixty compositions in one year before he stopped teaching her after an argument about his fees. She also learned from Dattopant Desai before studying under Sawai Gandharva, a respected guru. Hangal could only study sporadically under Gandharva when he returned to his home, but she received an intensive training of three years after he relocated permanently to Hubli.

Musical career

Hangal's mother's family was considered to be of low social status and for women of her generation singing was not considered appropriate employment; Hangal struggled against this prejudice and made a career. She performed all over India and for All India Radio stations until 1945. Hangal had initially performed light classical genres, including bhajan and thumri, but concentrated on khyal. Later, however, she refused to sing light classical, saying she sang only ragas. Hangal served as honorary music professor of the Karnataka University. She gave her last concert in March 2006 to mark her 75th career year. Krishna Hangal, her daughter, would often provide her vocal support in concerts. Krishna-bai Hangal, who predeceased her more famous mother, was herself a performing musician who presented concerts. Gangubai Hangal had overcome bone marrow cancer in 2003, and died of cardiac arrest at the age of 96, on 21 July 2009, in Hubli, where she resided. She had her eyes donated to increase awareness for organ donation.

Personal life
Hangal married at age 16 to Gururao Kaulgi, a Brahmin lawyer. They had two sons, Narayan Rao and Babu Rao, and one daughter, Krishna, who died from cancer in 2004, aged 75.

Death
Gangubai died on July 21 in 2009. The Karnataka state government declared two days of mourning for Hangal. A state funeral was announced for 22 July in Hubli by the district commissioner of the Dharwad district.

Awards and honors

Gangubai Hangal received a number of awards, which include:
Karnataka Sangeet Nritya Academy Award, 1962
 Padma Bhushan, 1971
 Sangeet Natak Akademi Award, 1973
 Sangeet Natak Akademi Fellowship, 1996
 Padma Vibhushan, 2002

In 2008, The State Government of Karnataka decided to name the proposed Karnataka State Music University, Mysore after Gangubhai Hangal. Subsequently, the Karnataka State Dr. Gangubai Hangal Music and Performing Arts University Act, 2009 has been passed by the State Legislature. Presently the Karnataka State Dr. Gangubhai Hangal Music and Performing Arts University operates from Mysore, Karnataka.

Gangothri — the birthplace of Gangubai Hangal — has been converted into a museum by the Government of Karnataka.

Dr Gangubai Hangal Gurukul in Hubli trains artists in traditional Guru-Shishya parampara to become performing artists.

In September 2014, a postage stamp featuring Hangal was released by India Post commemorating her contributions to Hindustani music.

See also
Bhimsen Joshi

References

Further reading 
 Nanna Badukina Haadu (The Song of My Life), as told to Mr. N.K.Kulkarni, translated into English by G. N. Hangal, published by Sahitya Prakashan, Hubli.

External links

 Gangubai Hangal page at Vijaya Parrikar Library of Indian Classical Music
 Gangubai Hangal Detailed Biography
 Gangubai Hangal feted on her 94th birthday
 Gangubai Hangal auf culturebase.net

1913 births
2009 deaths
Hindustani singers
Kannada people
Recipients of the Padma Bhushan in arts
Recipients of the Padma Vibhushan in arts
People from Dharwad
Recipients of the Sangeet Natak Akademi Award
Recipients of the Sangeet Natak Akademi Fellowship
Kirana gharana
Indian women classical singers
Academic staff of Karnatak University
Indian women songwriters
Singers from Karnataka
All India Radio people
Women Hindustani musicians
20th-century Khyal singers
20th-century Indian singers
All India Radio women
Women musicians from Karnataka
20th-century Indian women singers
21st-century Indian women singers
21st-century Indian singers